Muhammad Reza Cassam Uteem (born 1 December 1971) is a Mauritian politician who is commonly known as Reza Uteem.

Early life and education
Reza Uteem is the son of past President of Mauritius Cassam Uteem. He was educated at the University of Buckingham (LLB) and King's College London where he graduated with an LLM in International Business Law and was a Chevening Scholar. He was called to the Bar in England and in Mauritius and is the founder and head of Uteem Chambers.

Political career
He served as Second Member for Constituency No.2 Port Louis South & Port Louis Central in the National Assembly since 6 May 2010. He was returned as First Member for the same constituency on 11 December 2014. He is the President of Mouvement Militant Mauricien.

References

1971 births
Living people
Mauritian politicians of Indian descent
Alumni of the University of Buckingham
Alumni of King's College London
Members of the National Assembly (Mauritius)
Chevening Scholars